NGC 1903 is a star cluster in the Large Magellanic Cloud in the constellation Dorado.  It was discovered in 1834 by John Herschel with an 18.7-inch reflecting telescope.

Sources
 van Loon, J. Th.; Marshall, J. R.; Zijlstra, A. A.: Dust-enshrouded giants in clusters in the Magellanic Clouds; Astronomy and Astrophysics 442 (2), S. 597-613 (2005)

External links
 

1903
Dorado (constellation)
Star clusters
Large Magellanic Cloud